Dominic Burns (born 30 December 1983) is an English film director, screenwriter, producer and actor. After starting as an actor, Burns then moved into directing where he has made his name. When making such films as Airborne and UFO he frequently shoots his films in Derbyshire, his home county.

Early life

Burns was born in Derby and attended Ecclesbourne School in Duffield, Derbyshire, England. He then moved into the film industry in 2006.

Career

Burns was established as an actor in 2006 when he featured in a local Derby production, Sam Lennox's The Buck Rules where he was also the Associate Producer. He continued as an actor, with numerous roles including Jack Said, part of a trilogy, of which Burns went on to direct one.

Burns was launched as a director/producer by delivering the world's first single continuous-shot horror movie CUT. This was the first film that Burns directed, wrote, produced and acted in. CUT started Burns' fascination with the "Long Shot" which has become a style uses in most of his films.

Burns has also produced another British independent film in 2014, Devil's Tower which stars Jason Mewes & Roxanne Pallett, which was directed by Owen Tooth.

Most recently Burns produced and directed the WWII action drama Allies.

Filmography

Film

TV

References

External links

1983 births
Living people
English film directors
English film producers
English screenwriters
English male screenwriters
21st-century English male actors
English male film actors
English male television actors
People from Derby
English-language film directors
French-language film directors
German-language film directors
Science fiction film directors
Horror film directors
British film directors
British film producers